On and On and Beyond is the debut extended play by American rapper Mac Miller. It was released digitally on March 29, 2011. The tracks "Another Night", and "Live Free" were previously released on Mac Miller's 2009 mixtape The High Life, while "Life Ain't Easy", and "In the Air" are taken from 2011's Best Day Ever.Mac Miller to Drop New EP Next Week The EP entered the US Billboard 200 on April 16 2011 at number 55 on the chart.

Track listing

Charts

Weekly charts

Year-end charts

References

External links 

Mac Miller albums
2011 debut EPs